Marginura is an extinct genus of brittle star in the family Encrinasteridae. There is one described species in Marginura, M. hilleri.

References

Oegophiurida
Articles created by Qbugbot